The Image (or in French "L'Image") is a classic 1956 sadomasochistic erotic novel, written by Catherine Robbe-Grillet and published under the pseudonym of Jean de Berg by éditions de Minuit in 1956.

It was made into a 1975 film, The Image, also known as The Punishment of Anne.

Appraisals

Edmund White considered the novel "scandalous but eloquent...metaphysical".

Susan Sontag placed the text among the very few (5) erotic novels she considered to have serious artistic weight.

Theme
The Image is centred on a triangular relationship between the male narrator and two women, Anne and Claire. The narrator is puzzled by the meaning of their behavior throughout, gradually accumulating clues which only make full sense in the closing chapter, when Anne is revealed as the mirror image of the woman he actually loves, Claire.

See also

References 

1956 novels
BDSM literature
French erotic novels
French novels adapted into films
Works published under a pseudonym